Joseph Nathaneal Foster (born 5 July 1982 in London) is a British racing driver. He has competed in such series as Le Mans Series, Australian Formula Ford Championship and the German Formula Three Championship. He won the 2009 Australian Drivers' Championship for Team BRM. Foster also won the Formula Ford Festival in 2003 and 2017.

24 Hours of Le Mans results

References

External links
 Official website
 Career statistics from Driver Database

1982 births
Living people
Sportspeople from London
English racing drivers
Formula Ford drivers
British Formula Renault 2.0 drivers
24 Hours of Le Mans drivers
German Formula Three Championship drivers
Australian Formula 3 Championship drivers
European Le Mans Series drivers
U.S. F2000 National Championship drivers
Porsche Carrera Cup GB drivers

Motaworld Racing drivers